The Treblinka extermination camp was run by the SS, a Nazi paramilitary organization, with the help of Eastern European Trawnikis (Hiwis), who were collaborationist auxiliary police recruited directly from Soviet POW camps. The Trawnikis served at all the major extermination camps, including Treblinka. Treblinka was part of Operation Reinhard, the systematic extermination of the three million Jews living in the General Government of German-occupied Poland. It is believed that between somewhere between 800,000 and 1,200,000 people were murdered in its gas chambers, almost all of whom were Jews. More people were murdered at Treblinka than at any other Nazi extermination camp besides Auschwitz.

The camp consisted of two separate units: Treblinka I and the Treblinka II extermination camp (Vernichtungslager). The first was a forced-labour camp (Arbeitslager) whose prisoners worked in the gravel pit or irrigation area and in the forest, where they cut wood to fuel the crematoria. Between 1941 and 1944, more than half of its 20,000 inmates died from summary executions, hunger, disease and mistreatment.

Meanwhile, the first official German trial for war crimes committed at Treblinka was also held in 1964, with the former camp personnel first brought to justice at that time, some twenty years after the end of the war.

List of individuals responsible

Citations

References

External links

1942 in Poland
1943 disestablishments
1943 in Poland

Treblinka extermination camp
World War II sites of Nazi Germany
World War II sites in Poland